Sardinia's Day, also known as Sardinian people's Day, is a holiday in Sardinia commemorating the Sardinian Vespers occurring in 1794–96.

History
In the last decades of the 18th century following the Savoyard take-over of the island and the once Spanish Kingdom, tensions had begun to mount among the Sardinians towards the Piedmontese administration. Sardinian peasants resented the feudal rule and both the local nobles and the bourgeoisie were being left out of any active civil and military role, with the viceroy and other people from the Italian mainland being appointed in charge of the island. Such political unrest was bolstered further by the international situation, with particular regard to the ferment developing in other European regions (namely Ireland, Poland, Belgium, Hungary, Tyrol) and the episodes leading to the French Revolution.

In 1793, a French fleet tried to conquer the island along two lines of attack, the first one across the southern coast in Cagliari and the other in the nearby of the Maddalena archipelago. However, the locals managed to resist the invasion by the French, and began expecting the Savoyards to acknowledge the feat and improve their condition in return. The Sardinians thus presented with the King a list of grievances requiring his remedy, amongst which the demand that most of the offices be reserved for native Sardinians, along with autonomy from the Savoyard ruling class.

Insurrection
The King's peremptory refusal to grant the island any of these wishes eventually spurred the rebellion against Piedmont's primacy within the Kingdom, with the arrest of two notable figures of the so-called "Patriotic Party" (the lawyers from Cagliari Vincenzo Cabras and Efisio Pintor) being the final spark of unrest amongst the populace.

By May, all the 514 Savoyard officers were put on a boat and sent back to the mainland. Encouraged by what happened in Cagliari, the people in Sassari and Alghero did the same, and the revolt spread throughout the rest of the island in the countryside.

Thus, Sardinia became the first European country to have engaged in a revolution of its own, the episode not being the result of a foreign military importation like in most of Europe.

End
The uprising was then led for another two years by the republican Giovanni Maria Angioy, then a judge of the Royal Hearing (Reale Udienza), but it was later repressed by the loyalist forces that became bolstered by the peace treaty between France and Piedmont in 1796. The revolutionary experiment was thus brought to an end and Sardinia remained under Savoyard rule.

A period of restoration of the monarchical and aristocratic values would follow the Sardinian revolution, culminating in the Perfect Fusion between the island and the mainland; however, they did not manage to crack down on a couple of localized but significant antifeudal revolts that would arise, from time to time, up until 1821, like the so-called "Palabanda's Conspiracy" in Cagliari of 1812 and the rebellion in Alghero of 1821.

Institutionalization of the date
The actual date was chosen in 1993 and public events are being annually held to commemorate the episode, while the schools are closed.

See also
Su patriottu sardu a sos feudatarios, official Sardinian hymn and a revolutionary anthem
History of Sardinia

Notes

References
 Anonymous author (presumably Michele Obino). L'Achille della sarda liberazione, 1796.
 Lorenzo del Piano, Salvatore Frassu e i moti rivoluzionari della fine del '700 a Bono, Chiarella, 1989.
 Federico Francioni (ed. by), 1793: i franco-corsi sbarcano in Sardegna, Sassari, Condaghes, 1993.
 Federico Francioni, Vespro sardo : dagli esordi della dominazione piemontese all'insurrezione del 28 aprile 1794, Cagliari, Condaghes, 2001.
 Alberto Loni e Giuliano Carta. Sa die de sa Sardigna – Storia di una giornata gloriosa. Sassari, Isola editrice, 2003.
 Girolamo Sotgiu. L'insurrezione di Cagliari del 28 aprile 1794, Agorà, 2005.
 Massimo Pistis, Rivoluzionari in sottana. Ales sotto il vescovado di mons. Michele Aymerich, Roma, Albatros Il Filo, 2009.
 Adriano Bomboi, L'indipendentismo sardo. Le ragioni, la storia, i protagonisti, Cagliari, Condaghes, 2014.
 Omar Onnis, La Sardegna e i sardi nel tempo, Cagliari, Arkadia, 2015.

Sardinia
History of Sardinia